Kiara Fabiola Reyes Fontanilla (born July 1, 2000) is a footballer who plays as a goalkeeper for the Westcliff University Warriors. Born in the United States, she represents the Philippines women's national team.

Early life
Fontanilla was born in Fullerton, California to a Mexican mother, Fabiola (née Reyes), and a Filipino father, Francisco Fontanilla but was raised in Jurupa Valley and Eastvale. Her father has roots in Baguio having moved to the United States at age seven.She attended Norco High School where she graduated in 2018. She attended the Northwestern Oklahoma State University for her freshman year before moving to the California State University, Fullerton the following year. She then moved to the Eastern Oregon University in 2020.

Early career
Fontanilla played for the varsity women's football (soccer) team of Norco High School under head coach Daniel Graffa. She was a two-year varsity letterwinner. In her senior season in 2017, she led her team to the California Interscholastic Federation. She also played for local soccer club Arsenal FC which she helped make it to six consecutive editions of the Surf Cup from 2013 to 2018.

College career
As a freshman, Fontanilla played for the Northwestern Oklahoma State Rangers. She became part of the Cal State Fullerton Titans women's soccer team for the 2019 season. She redshirted for her sophomore season. She was part of the Titans squad which won the Big West regular season Conference Championship and Tournament Championship. In the 2020 season, she joined the Eastern Oregon University Mountaineers.

International career
Fontanilla is eligible to represent the Philippines through her Filipino father. However she had to secure Filipino citizenship for herself and her father who has not been in the Philippines for the past 40 years. She is part of the Philippines squad which participated in the 2022 AFC Women's Asian Cup in India. A third-choice keeper for the tournament, she made her senior national team debut in the Philippines' 0–4 loss to Australia.

Honours

International

Philippines 

 AFF Women's Championship: 2022

References

External links

2000 births
Living people
Citizens of the Philippines through descent
Filipino women's footballers
Women's association football goalkeepers
Philippines women's international footballers
Filipino people of Mexican descent
Sportspeople from Fullerton, California
Soccer players from California
Sportspeople from Riverside County, California
People from Eastvale, California
American women's soccer players
Northwestern Oklahoma State Rangers athletes
Cal State Fullerton Titans women's soccer players
Eastern Oregon University alumni
College women's soccer players in the United States
American sportspeople of Mexican descent
American sportspeople of Filipino descent